Locust Valley High School is a public high school located in Lattingtown, Nassau County, New York, U.S.A., and is the only high school operated by the Locust Valley Central School District.

As of the 2014–15 school year, the school had an enrollment of 716 students and 45.3 classroom teachers (on an FTE basis), for a student–teacher ratio of 15.8:1. There were 81 students (11.3% of enrollment) eligible for free lunch and 21 (2.9% of students) eligible for reduced-cost lunch.

Footnotes

Schools in Nassau County, New York
Public high schools in New York (state)